Epischnia oculatella is a species of snout moth in the genus Epischnia. It was described by Ragonot in 1887. It is found in Iran.

The wingspan is about 26 mm.

References

Moths described in 1887
Phycitini